Guyjeh Qaleh may refer to:
 Guyjeh Qaleh-ye Olya
 Guyjeh Qaleh-ye Sofla

See also
 Gowjeh Qaleh (disambiguation)